Igor Albertovich Kesaev (born 30 October 1966) is a Russian billionaire retail businessman.

Net worth 
On the Forbes 2022 list of the world's billionaires, he was ranked #1196 with a net worth of US$2.6 billion.

Personal life 
Kesaev's home town is Vladikavkaz and he resides in Moscow. He received a bachelor's degree from the Moscow Institute of International Relations. Kesaev is married and has three children.

References

1966 births
Living people
Russian oligarchs
Russian billionaires
Place of birth missing (living people)
Russian emigrants to Cyprus
People from Vladikavkaz